Gaston Michel (1856 – November 1921) was a French silent film actor. He starred in some 40 films between 1913 and his death in 1921.

He died in November 1921, in Lisbon, Portugal.

Selected filmography
 Les Vampires  (1915)
 Judex  (1916)
 Tih Minh (1918)
 Barabbas (1920)
 Parisette (1921)
 The Two Girls (1921)

External links 

1856 births
1921 deaths
French male film actors
French male silent film actors
20th-century French male actors